In molecular biology, ZNFX1 antisense RNA 1, also known as ZNFX1-AS1 or ZFAS1, is a long non-coding RNA. It is expressed in the lung and mammary gland in mice. Its expression is down-regulated in mammary tumours, it may function as a tumour suppressor gene. The ZNFX1-AS1 gene hosts three snoRNA genes (SNORD12, SNORD12B and SNORD12C)).

See also
 Long noncoding RNA

References

Non-coding RNA